Tarsis Bonga (born 10 January 1997) is a German professional footballer who plays as a centre-forward for  club Eintracht Braunschweig.

Club career
On 24 January 2023, Bonga signed with Eintracht Braunschweig for the remainder of the 2022–23 season.

Personal life
Born in Germany, Bonga is of Congolese descent. Bonga's younger brother, Isaac, is a professional basketball player for the Toronto Raptors of the NBA.

Career statistics

References

External links
 

1997 births
Living people
People from Neuwied
German footballers

German sportspeople of Democratic Republic of the Congo descent
Footballers from Rhineland-Palatinate
Association football forwards
Fortuna Düsseldorf II players
FSV Zwickau players
Chemnitzer FC players
VfL Bochum players
Eintracht Braunschweig players
Bundesliga players
3. Liga players
Regionalliga players